FTG may refer to:
 FTG (band), a Malaysian thrash metal band
 Ferdinand Tönnies Society, a German sociological research society
 Ferntree Gully railway station, in Victoria, Australia
 Fixed turbine geometry in a turbocharger
 Front Range Airport, near Aurora, Colorado, United States
 First Touch Games, an indie development team and creators of Dream League Soccer